Mirabel is a former settlement in Lake County, California.

The town was named from the nearby Mirabel Mine. A post office operated at Mirabel from 1892 to 1893.

References

Former settlements in Lake County, California
Former populated places in California